The XIX Constitutional Government of Portugal had Pedro Passos Coelho as the prime minister and lasted from 21 June 2011 to 30 October 2015.

Composition

References 

2011 establishments in Portugal
2015 disestablishments in Portugal
Cabinets established in 2011
Cabinets disestablished in 2015
Constitutional Governments of Portugal